MNW Music AB is a Swedish record company and was founded in 1969 in Vaxholm as Music Network Corps AB by Sverre Sundman, Lorne deWolfe and Lynn deWolfe. It is now located in Stockholm.

History
After a financial crisis in the spring of 1971, the company was rescued by Tore Berger, from the group Gunder Hägg (later Blå Tåget), investing his own money and the company was transformed into Musiknätet Waxholm.

MNW was then one of the most important record companies in the music movement, focusing on Swedish musicians with Swedish texts, and political considerations often governed the publication. MNW Records Group was formed in 1993 when the company bought another record company called Amalthea.
The right to release records was transferred to Push Music Group in 2004. The collaboration ended and Push Music changed its name to MNW Music.

On September 22, 2015 artist Johan Johansson (KSMB) won a lawsuit claiming that the MNW has put out music streaming services without a license.

Artists

Current

Blå Tåget
Tore Berger
Bosson
Fläskkvartetten
Toni Holgersson
Masayah
Roger Pontare
Irma Schultz Keller
Union Carbide Productions

Former

Arbete Och Fritid
Atacama
Backyard Babies
Björn Afzelius
Contact
Brända Barn
Thomas Di Leva
Ebba Grön
Don Fardon
Kim Fowley
Hawkey Franzen
Gläns Över Sjö Och Strand
Gunder Hägg
Hellacopters
Hoola Bandoola Band
Imperiet
KSMB
Musikens Vänner
New Temperance Seven
NJA-Gruppen
Norrlåtar
Peter LeMarc
Pink Champagne
Nationalteatern
Scorpion
Sheila Chandra (Indipop Records)
Stefan Sundström
Tant Strul
Vildkaktus
Wannadies
Mikael Wiehe
Wilmer X

Sublabels
 No Fashion Records

External links
 "MNW Music AB" on Encyclopedia Metallum

Swedish record labels
IFPI members